Francis Johnson (died 1605), of Aldeburgh, Suffolk, was an English politician.

He was a Member (MP) of the Parliament of England for Aldeburgh in 1597.

References

16th-century births
1605 deaths
People from Aldeburgh
English MPs 1597–1598